Felipe III is the name of two Spanish kings who also ruled over Portugal:

Philip III of Spain (II of Portugal)
Philip III of Portugal (IV of Spain)

See also
Philip III (disambiguation)